Nomindra is a genus of Australian ground spiders that was first described by Norman I. Platnick & Barbara Baehr in 2006. Originally placed with the long-spinneret ground spiders, it was transferred to the ground spiders in 2018.

Species
 it contains sixteen species, found in Victoria, Queensland, South Australia, Western Australia, and the Northern Territory:
Nomindra arenaria Platnick & Baehr, 2006 – Australia (Northern Territory)
Nomindra barlee Platnick & Baehr, 2006 – Australia (Western Australia)
Nomindra berrimah Platnick & Baehr, 2006 – Australia (Northern Territory)
Nomindra cocklebiddy Platnick & Baehr, 2006 – Australia (Western Australia)
Nomindra cooma Platnick & Baehr, 2006 – Australia (Western Australia)
Nomindra fisheri Platnick & Baehr, 2006 – Australia (Northern Territory)
Nomindra flavipes (Simon, 1908) – Australia (Western Australia, South Australia)
Nomindra gregory Platnick & Baehr, 2006 – Australia (Western Australia, Northern Territory)
Nomindra indulkana Platnick & Baehr, 2006 – Australia (Western Australia, South Australia)
Nomindra jarrnarm Platnick & Baehr, 2006 – Australia (Western Australia, Northern Territory)
Nomindra kinchega Platnick & Baehr, 2006 (type) – Australia (South Australia, Queensland to Victoria)
Nomindra leeuweni Platnick & Baehr, 2006 – Southern Australia
Nomindra ormiston Platnick & Baehr, 2006 – Australia (Northern Territory, South Australia)
Nomindra thatch Platnick & Baehr, 2006 – Australia (Queensland)
Nomindra woodstock Platnick & Baehr, 2006 – Australia (Western Australia)
Nomindra yeni Platnick & Baehr, 2006 – Australia (Western Australia to Queensland)

See also
 List of Gnaphosidae species

References

Araneomorphae genera
Gnaphosidae
Spiders of Australia